That's The Way It Goes may refer to:

That's the Way It Goes (Anne Murray song) written by Kerry Chater, Lynn Gillespie Chater, and Cyril Rawson 
That's The Way It Goes (George Harrison song)
"That's The Way It Goes", song by Wally Lewis (singer), W. Lewis 1959
"That's The Way It Goes", song by Chubby Checker,		Low, Palmann 1961
"That's The Way It Goes", song by Eddie Fisher (singer), Al Stillman, Heine Gaze 1958 Lonny Kellner Heino Gaze, Al Stillman	1957
"That's The Way It Goes", song by Matt Monro,	Dennis King, John Junkin 1969
"That's The Way It Goes", song by	The Four Seasons (band) Bob Crewe, Robert Boulanger	1963
"That's The Way It Goes", song by Hal Willis (singer)	- 1959
"That's The Way It Goes", song by The Harptones, Raoul J. Cita, Don Parker, Morris Levy 1956 The Manhattan Transfer 1984
"That's The Way It Goes", song by The King Brothers,	- 1969
"That's The Way It Goes", song by Lefty Frizzell,	- 1974
"That’s The Way It Goes song recorded by Peggy Lee, written by (Morris Levy, Don Parker) 1941
"That's The Way It Goes", song by Les Emmerson, Emmerson	1973
"That's The Way It Goes", song by The Mojos, James, Crouch	1965
"That's The Way It Goes", song by The Shadows, Welch, Marvin 1964 covered Frank Ifield	1961 The Crickets   1965
That´s The Way (It Goes), song by	Jimmy McCracklin, McCracklin	1963
"That's The Way It Goes", song by Majik Mijits 1981
"That's The Way It Goes", song by the Eyeliners from Here Comes Trouble (The Eyeliners album)
"That's The Way It Goes", song by the Swinging Blue Jeans from Blue Jeans a'Swinging
Guess That's The Way It Goes, song	Don Charles, Meek	1962
That's The Way That It Goes, song by	Bobby Marchan, Cropper, Marchan, Jackson	1963